Paa Kwesi Nduom or Papa Kwesi Nduom, (born February 15, 1953) is a Ghanaian business consultant, politician, and founding member of Ghana's Progressive People's Party. A three-time nominee for president, he was the member of parliament for the Komenda-Edina-Eguafo-Abirem constituency and served as minister of state in the Kufuor government.

Early life and education 
Paa Kwesi Nduom was born in Elmina in the Central Region of Ghana. He was named Joseph Hubster Yorke Jr after his father. He had his secondary education at the St. Augustine's College in Cape Coast, where he obtained both the General Certificate of Education (GCE) Ordinary and Advanced Levels("O" level and "A" levels).He proceeded to the United States where he obtained a Bachelor of Arts (Economics) degree at the University of Wisconsin–Milwaukee in 1975. He subsequently went on to pursue a Master's degree in Management (1977) and a Ph.D (Service Delivery Systems) in 1982 at the same university.

Career 
Nduom started work as a life insurance underwriter with the North Western Mutual Life Insurance Company between 1975 and 1978. Over the next year, he worked with Blue Cross Blue Shield of Wisconsin. In 1979, he joined the Milwaukee Metropolitan Sewerage District as a budget and management analyst. In 1981, he joined Deloitte and Touche as an associate consultant, rising to become a partner in the firms' Milwaukee office by 1986. In 1992, he helped establish Deloitte & Touche's West Africa Consulting division.

He served as a board member for Fan Milk Ghana Limited, Edinaman Secondary School and the Ghana Heritage and Conservation Trust.

He shares ownership of GN Savings and Loans with other shareholders. He is also the owner of Groupe Ndoum and Coconut Grove Resort in Ghana.

Politics 
District Assembly
His active role in politics began in 1997 when he was elected as a member of the Komenda-Edina-Eguafo-Abirem District Assembly for the Akotobinsin Electoral Area.

National politics

In December 2000, he contested the Ghanaian parliamentary elections for the Komenda-Edina-Eguafo-Abirem constituency on the ticket of the Convention's People's Party (CPP). However, he lost to the incumbent MP, Ato Quarshie of the National Democratic Congress (NDC) by a margin of 2.6% of the valid votes cast. However, two months later, he was appointed by President John Kufuor as the Minister for Economic Planning although he was not a member of the ruling New Patriotic Party. He also served during this period as the Chairman of the National Development Planning Commission. During a cabinet reshuffle in April 2003, Nduom became the Minister for Energy. Eighteen months later, he again contested the Komenda-Edina-Eguafo-Abirem seat in the Ghanaian parliamentary election in December 2004 and this time he won by 33.6 points (30,981 votes to 15,427). At the time, he served as the chairman of the Organising Committee of the CPP. Early in President Kufuor's second term of office, Nduom became the Minister for Public Sector Reform. He continued in this capacity till July 2007 when he resigned from government to seek his party's nomination to stand as the CPP presidential candidate.

Bid for president
In December 2007, Nduom was nominated by the CPP to contest the December 2008 presidential election.
He lost the elections, getting less than 1% of the vote. During the CPP party elections of 2011, candidates reportedly supported by Nduom, including then Chairman Ladi Nylander, lost to newer candidates such as Samia Nkrumah, daughter of Ghana's first president Kwame Nkrumah Months later, Nduom was accused by the Convention People's Party of going against the party's regulations.
In January 2012, Nduom resigned from the CPP and formed his own party, the Progressive People's Party. He was the Progressive People's Party presidential candidate in the 2012 and 2016 elections.

Family 
Nduom is married to Yvonne Nduom, a management specialist and graduate of the University of Cape Coast in Ghana and the University of Wisconsin in the United States. They are married with four children, Dr. Nana Kweku Nduom, Dr. Edjah Kweku Nduom, Chief Nduom, and Dr. Nana Aba Nduom. Nana Kweku is married to Esinam Julia Nduom (née Baeta) and they have a daughter, Maame Adjoa Kakraba Nduom. Edjah is married to Kelley Nduom (née Coleman).

See also 
Kufuor government

Notes

External links and sources 
Official Campaign Website
Nduom website
Profile on Ghana Home Page
Pictures of Central Region MPs on GhanaDistricts.com

1953 births
Ghanaian Roman Catholics
Ghanaian MPs 2005–2009
Living people
Energy ministers of Ghana
Government ministers of Ghana
Progressive People's Party (Ghana) politicians
University of Wisconsin–Milwaukee alumni
Candidates for President of Ghana
St. Augustine's College (Cape Coast) alumni
Fante people
Ghanaian businesspeople
People from Central Region (Ghana)